HD 147018 b is a gas giant extrasolar planet which orbits the G-type main sequence star HD 147018, located approximately 140 light years away in the constellation Triangulum Australe. This planet has minimum mass more than twice that of Jupiter but this planet orbits a lot closer to the star than Jupiter to the Sun by a factor of 22. Meanwhile, it has an eccentric orbit. The planet can get as close to the star as 0.13 AU or can get as far as 0.35 AU. Further out, there is another superjovian planet HD 147018 c, which was discovered on the same date as this planet, on August 11, 2009.

References 

 

Exoplanets discovered in 2009
Giant planets
Triangulum Australe
Exoplanets detected by radial velocity